The Deutsches Geodätisches Forschungsinstitut (German Geodetic Research Institute), commonly abbreviated as "DGFI", is a research institute located in Munich, Germany, dedicated to the study of Geodesy.  It was established in 1951, and operates under the auspices of the Bavarian Academy of Sciences and Humanities.

References

External links
official website

Organisations based in Munich
Geodesy organizations
1951 establishments in Germany
Organizations established in 1951
Research institutes in Germany